Justice Patterson may refer to:

Anne M. Patterson (born 1959), associate justice of the New Jersey Supreme Court
Frances Patterson (1954–2016), justice of the High Court of England
Neville Patterson (1916–1987), associate justice and chief justice of the Supreme Court of Mississippi

See also
William Paterson (judge) (1745–1806), associate justice of the United States Supreme Court 
John M. Patterson (1921–2021), chief justice of a "Special Supreme Court" that tried the case of Alabama Chief Justice Roy Moore
Judge Patterson (disambiguation)